Hit Kit is a greatest-hits compilation by American singer-songwriter Sam Cooke.  The package of previously released singles was assembled, according to Cashbox, for "quick commercial consumption."

The album was released in 1959 on Keen Records.

Track listing

Side one
 Only Sixteen – 2:00
 All of My Life – 2:20
 Everybody Loves to Cha Cha Cha – 2:35
 Blue Moon – 2:45
 Win Your Love for Me – 2:26
 Lonely Island – 2:31

Side two
 You Send Me – 2:41
 Love You Most of All – 2:15
 For Sentimental Reasons – 2:40
 Little Things You Do – 2:13
 Let's Go Steady Again – 2:29
 You Were Made for Me – 2:52

References

Sam Cooke compilation albums
1959 compilation albums
Keen Records albums
Albums produced by Russ Titelman